Washington Street is a surface stop on the Massachusetts Bay Transportation Authority (MBTA)'s Green Line B branch, located in Brighton, Boston.  The station is located in the median of Commonwealth Avenue northeast of Washington Street.  Washington Street station consists of two side platforms, which serve the B branch's two tracks. The station is fully accessible.

History

From October 27, 1926, to January 23, 1953, a passing siding was in place just east of Washington Street. It was occasionally used to short turn trains.

In the early 2000s, the MBTA modified key surface stops with raised platforms for accessibility. The renovation of Washington Square - part of a $32 million modification of thirteen B, C, and E branch stations - began in November 2001. During construction, temporary platforms south of Washington Street were used.

Around 2006, the MBTA added wooden mini-high platforms on the inbound end of both platforms, allowing level boarding on older Type 7 LRVs. These platforms were installed at eight Green Line stations in 2006–07 as part of the settlement of Joanne Daniels-Finegold, et al. v. MBTA. The mini-high platforms were removed in 2020 during a trackwork project.

References

External links

MBTA – Washington Street
Station from Washington Street from Google Maps Street View

Brighton, Boston
Green Line (MBTA) stations
Railway stations in Boston